Duncan Cederman (born 10 October 1978) is a New Zealand cricketer. He played in one first-class match for Central Districts in 2005.

See also
 List of Central Districts representative cricketers

References

External links
 

1978 births
Living people
New Zealand cricketers
Central Districts cricketers
Cricketers from Nelson, New Zealand